Ferenc Hirzer (21 November 1902 – 28 April 1957) known in Hungarian as Ferenc Híres was a Hungarian football player and manager, who played as a forward during the 1910s and 1920s; he is perhaps best known for his time with Italian side Juventus. He also played for the Hungarian national football team thirty-two different times, scoring fourteen goals.

Club career
Hirzer began his football career in 1913 with local Budapest side Törekvés SE, which was put together by railroadmen. In the early 1920s, the club reached the upper parts of the Hungarian League but it was largely dominated at the time by MTK Budapest.

After around a decade playing for his hometown club, Ferenc Hizer moved to the Czech Republic to play this club football for Makkabi Brno. The following season, he moved to Germany to play for Union 03 Altona in the city of Hamburg, they finished runners-up in the Norddeutsche Liga.

For the 1925–26 season, Hirzer moved country again; this time to Italy with Turin giants Juventus. A fellow Hungarian, Jenő Károly was manager at the time and he had already brought former Toerekvés player József Viola to the club. He made his debut in October 1925 against Parma scoring a hat-trick.

Juventus were crowned champions of the Italian Football Championship for the first time in 20 years; Hirzer himself had a very impressive end of season record, scoring 35 goals in astonishingly 24 games. This record for the most goals scored by a Juventus player in a single season in the best Italian league, then named Prima Divisione, has never been broken. After one more season at Juventus, where they finished 3rd behind Torino and Bologna he left Italian football. Hirzer had scored a total of 50 goals in 43 games for Juventus during his time with them.

He returned to Hungary in 1927 and played for MTK Hungária back in Budapest. During the 1928–29 season, Hirzer's final season as a player, the club won the Hungarian League title. After his playing career, Hirzer returned to Italy and managed several Italian clubs until around the time of his death, the club he managed for the longest period was Salernitana in Campania.

International career

.Hirzer was first called up for duty in the Hungarian national side for a match against Switzerland in June 1922, the game ended in a 1–1 draw. He represented Hungary at the 1924 Summer Olympics in Paris, where he scored two goals in the first round 5–0 victory against Poland, in the next round however they were knocked out with a shock 2-0 defeat to Egypt.
He also represented Hungary in the 1927-30 Central European International Cup, where he became top scorer but despite his efforts, Hungary ended as fourth. In total he scored 14 goals in 32 games for his country.

Honours

Club
Juventus
Serie A/Prima Divisione: 1925–26

MTK Hungária
Hungarian League: 1928–29

International
Hungary
 Central European International Cup: Fourth 1927-30

Individual
 Central European International Cup: Top scorer 1927-30
 Serie A Top-scorer: 1925–26 (35 goals in Prima Divisione in 24 games!)

References

1902 births
1957 deaths
Hungarian people of German descent
Association football forwards
Hungarian footballers
Hungary international footballers
Hungarian expatriate footballers
Hungarian expatriate sportspeople in Italy
Hungarian expatriate sportspeople in Czechoslovakia
Juventus F.C. players
Serie A players
Olympic footballers of Hungary
Footballers at the 1924 Summer Olympics
Expatriate footballers in Italy
Expatriate footballers in Czechoslovakia

Hungarian football managers
Mantova 1911 managers
U.S. Salernitana 1919 managers
A.C. Ancona managers
Footballers from Budapest
F.S. Sestrese Calcio 1919 managers
Benevento Calcio managers